Mars Attacks is a science fiction-themed trading card series released in 1962 by Topps. The cards feature artwork by science fiction artists Wally Wood and Norman Saunders. The cards form a story arc, which tells of the invasion of Earth by cruel, hideous Martians under the command of a corrupt Martian government who conceal the fact from the Martian populace that Mars is doomed to explode and, therefore, proposes colonization of Earth to turn it into their new homeworld. The cards depict futuristic battle scenes and bizarre methods of Martian attack, torture and slaughter of humans, as well as various Earth nations being attacked. The story concludes with an expeditionary force of humans volunteering to embark on a counterattack on Mars, in which the Earth force attacks the Martians in their manner (bayoneting and bullets). This necessitates the Martians that are still on Mars to defend their homeworld. The Earth attack forces, after destroying the Martian cities and killing the Martians, depart just before Mars is destroyed in the predicted cataclysm, thus ensuring the peace and safety of Earth as the Martian race is seemingly doomed to extinction.

Scholar Nathan Brownstone noted that "The Mars Attacks cards achieved their popularity at the very time when the Cuban Missile Crisis captured the headlines, the moment when Cold War came closest to become radioactively hot. That was when a brutal zero-sum game scenario - for Humanity to survive the Martians must die - established a solid niche in Americana popular culture".

The cards proved popular with children, but depictions of explicit gore and implied sexual content caused an outcry, leading the company to halt production. The cards have since become collectors' items, with certain cards commanding over $3,500 at auction.

In the 1980s, Topps began developing merchandise based on the Mars Attacks storyline, including mini-comic books and card reprints. An expanded set of 100 cards called Mars Attacks Archives was issued in 1994 by Topps and spawned a second round of merchandising. Director Tim Burton released a feature film called Mars Attacks! in 1996 based on the series, spawning a third round of merchandising, including an intercompany crossover with the Image Universe, titled Mars Attacks Image and published by Image Comics. In 2012, Topps released a 50th anniversary expanded set of 75 cards called Mars Attacks Heritage, leading to a fourth round of merchandising that continued into 2017 with the release of an official sequel series, Mars Attacks: The Revenge!

Trading cards

The Mars Attacks trading card series was created by Topps in 1962. Product developer Len Brown, inspired by Wally Wood's cover for EC Comics' Weird Science #16, pitched the idea to Woody Gelman. Gelman and Brown created the story — with Brown writing the copy — and created rough sketches. They enlisted Wood to flesh out the sketches and Bob Powell to finish them. Norman Saunders painted most of the 55-card set (Maurice Blumenfeld painted 10 - 20% of them, but Saunders provided the finishing touches to all of the images).

The cards, which sold for five cents per pack of five, were test marketed by Topps through the dummy corporation Bubbles, Inc. under the name Attack from Space. Sales were sufficient to expand the marketing and the name was changed to Mars Attacks. The cards sparked parental and community outrage over their graphic violence and implied sexuality. Topps responded initially by repainting 13 of the 55 cards to reduce the gore and sexuality. However, inquiries from a Connecticut district attorney caused Topps to halt production of the series altogether before the replacements could even be printed.

Adaptations and merchandising
In 1984, the first official item was released since the original set appeared: a direct copy of the original set of 55 cards, plus a 56th card that reprinted the wrapper graphics, was released by Renata Galasso Inc. through an agreement with Topps.

In 1994, Topps re-released the cards as the expanded Mars Attacks Archives, with the original 55 cards and 45 "New Visions" cards. The new cards are further divided into a #0 card, three subsets ("The Unpublished 11" (with 11 cards)), "Mars Attacks: The Comics" (with 10 cards) and "Visions: New and Original" (a.k.a. "New Visions"; with 22 cards)) and one card called "Norm Saunders: A Self-Portrait". 21 artists collaborated on the new cards, including Zina Saunders, the daughter of the original artist Norman Saunders. Topps Comics, in conjunction with the trading cards, issued a five-issue comic book miniseries based on the original 55 cards written by Keith Giffen and drawn by Charles Adlard. Topps Comics continued the story in an ongoing series that lasted seven issues, a one-shot special and three more miniseries. Wizard magazine and Topps Comics also published a #1/2 issue and an Ace Edition issue (#65).

In 1995, one year after the Archives series, Screamin' Productions and Topps released a tie-in set of eight Mars Attacks vinyl model kits with an accompanying series of eight new trading cards, each one inside one of the kits. Bonus items that could be acquired by sending in proof-of-purchase certificates from all eight of the kits were two new nearly identical bonus cards (one oversized card with the Mars Attacks logo on the top of it and one regular-sized card without it) and a limited edition ninth vinyl model kit.

In 1996, Warner Bros. released Tim Burton's feature film adaptation Mars Attacks!. In conjunction, two hardcover novels were released: Mars Attacks: Martian Deathtrap by Nathan Archer; and Mars Attacks: War Dogs of the Golden Horde by Ray W. Murrill. Each contained two new trading cards inside the middle of each book (the paperback editions, however, did not have the trading cards inside them). A paperback movie tie-in novelization by the film's screenwriter was also published, in addition to two comic book intercompany crossovers with Image Comics continuing the Topps Comics run, titled Mars Attacks the Savage Dragon and Mars Attacks Image while respectively depicting the Martians battling the Image Comics superhero the Savage Dragon, and the Martians battling other characters from the wider Image Universe. Trendmasters also produced a series of toy figures based on the film.

In 2012, to commemorate the franchise's 50th anniversary, Topps partnered with a variety of companies on comic books (via IDW Publishing), bobbleheads and vinyl figures (Funko POP!), action figures and plush toys (Mezco Toyz), costumes (Incogneato), statues and busts (Quarantine Studio), electronics skins (Gelaskins) and a commemorative hardcover book and 2013 wall calendar, both with nearly identical sets of four new trading cards (the only difference being that the book's cards had white borders on the front of the cards and the calendar's cards had green borders) (Abrams Books). Topps also re-released the original 55-card series again as the expanded Mars Attacks Heritage, including two subsets ("Deleted Scenes" (with 10 cards) and "Guide to the New Universe" (with 15 cards)).

In 2013, Topps issued Mars Attacks: Invasion, a reboot series of 95 trading cards featuring a new story (Mars Attacks: Invasion (cards #1-58, plus a #0 promo card from the 2013 San Diego Comic-Con)) with new artwork cards (divided into "Mars Invades IDW" (cards #59-77 and #91-92) and "Art of Mars Attacks" (cards #78-90 and #93-95)) and including four new subsets ("Mars Attacks: Early Missions" (with six cards), "Mars Attacks Masterpieces" (with five cards), "Join the Fight!" (with four cards) and "Anatomy of a Martian" (also with six cards)). This was the last Mars Attacks trading card series to be sold in retail stores as of this date; all other such series have been sold online ever since.

A second series of 81 trading cards, Mars Attacks: Occupation, also featuring a second reboot series of 81 trading cards that picked up where Mars Attacks: Invasion left off (Mars Attacks: Occupation (cards #1-45) with new artwork cards (divided into "Art of Mars Attacks" (cards #46-63), "Factions" (cards #64-72), "Occupation Profiles" (cards #73-78) and "The Kickstarter Video" (cards #79-81)) and including six new subsets ("Mars Attacks Superstars", Mars Attacks: Then and Now!", "Mars Attacks All-Star Art" and "Dinosaurs Attack! vs. Mars Attacks" (each with nine cards (the last one of which was also available as a foil card set)), "Attacky Packages" (a hybrid subset between Mars Attacks and Wacky Packages with 13 cards; the last three cards were titled "Attacky Packages Old School" (like "Dinosaurs Attack! vs. Mars Attacks", this one, too, was also available as a foil card set)) and "Mars Attacks/Judge Dredd" (with 18 cards)) was funded by Topps on Kickstarter in 2015 and released in 2016.

In 2017, to commemorate the franchise's 55th anniversary, Topps released an official sequel series to the original 1962 55-card series called Mars Attacks: The Revenge!, which takes place five years after the events in the original series and chronicles a second invasion of Earth by the surviving Martians that were off-world and on Earth during the destruction of Mars. It contained 110 cards - the story itself (cards #1-55) and rough pencil art for the story cards (cards #P-1-P-55). No subsets were made for this series. It was sold as a complete box set containing only the unwrapped 110 cards.

Bibliography
Stewart, Bhob, Bill Pearson, Roger Hill, Greg Sadowski and Wallace Wood (2003). Against the Grain: MAD Artist Wallace Wood. TwoMorrows Publishing.

See also
 Mars in fiction
 Dinosaurs Attack!
 The War of the Worlds

References

10. "Mars Attacks Interview w/ Len Brown" (by Kurt Kuersteiner for The Wrapper magazine #146). Retrieved 1/22/2021.

External links 
Mars Attacks (complete card set) (archive) – from trading-cards.org

Trading cards
Fiction set on Mars
Mass media franchises introduced in 1962
Topps Comics titles
Image Comics titles
IDW Publishing titles
Topps franchises
Military fiction